Saccharomycetales belongs to the kingdom of Fungi and the division Ascomycota. It is the only order in the class Saccharomycetes. There are currently 13 families recognized as belonging to Saccharomycetales. GBIF also includes; Alloascoideaceae (with 5 genera), Eremotheciaceae (16) Trigonopsidaceae (with 36) and Wickerhamomycetaceae (with 141 genera).

Genera incertae sedis
According to The Mycota, genera included in the order, but of uncertain taxonomic position (incertae sedis) include Ascobotryozyma , Babjeviella, Botryozyma, Candida pro parte, Citeromyces, Coccidiascus, Komagataella, Kuraishia, Macrorhabdus  (2), Nadsonia , Nakazawaea, Pachysolen, Peterozyma, Schizoblastosporidon , Sporopachydermia, and Trigonopsis.

GBIF also lists; Actonia , Aphidomyces  (5), Ascotrichosporon, Azymocandida, Bacillopsis , Berkhoutia, Blastodendrion, Cicadomyces , Dabaryomyces , Deakozyma  (3), Diutina  (24), Dolichoascus , Enantiothamnus , Endomycodes , Entelexis , Ephebella , Eutorulopsis , Fragosia , Limtongella, Menezesia , Metahyphopichia, Middelhovenomyces  (4), Mycotorula, Oleina , Parendomyces , Pseudomycoderma , Psyllidomyces , Sachsia , Saturnospora , Starmerella  (103), Suhomyces  (60), Syringospora , Teunomyces  (22), Thailandia, Torulopsis  (26), and Tyridiomyces .

Figures in brackets are approx. how many species per genus.

References

External links
 Tree of Life: Saccharomycetales

Yeasts
Saccharomycetes
Ascomycota orders